There are 16 barangays in Marikina, a city in Metro Manila, Philippines. The most recent barangays to be created are Fortune and Tumana, which in 2007 were separated from Barangay Parang and Barangay Concepcion Uno respectively.

Barangka

Barangka is named after the Spanish canyon, barranca. It is located along the western border of Marikina, is bordered on the west by Loyola Heights in Quezon City; to the south City; to the south by barangays Industrial Valley and Calumpang; to the east by Tañong; and the north by Loyola Grand Villas. On its south portion lies the Marikina River where the Riverbanks Center is located. Barangka actually lies on the hills of Quezon City, not too far from the Marikina fault system. Along with former Parang and Nangka, the former sitio was elevated to barrio (now termed barangay) by virtue of Republic Act No. 2601, which was enacted on June 21, 1959. Barangka is surrounded by schools, shopping malls, industrial zones, and transport hubs. It is accessible to neighboring commercial and business areas.

Point of Interests:
 Barangka Barangay Hall
 Loyola Memorial Park
 Philippine Science Centrum
 Plaza de los Kapitanes
 Riverbanks Amphitheater
 Riverbanks Mall
 A. Bonifacio Avenue
 Largest Shoe Display at Riverbanks
 Christmas Bazaar and Fair during Holiday season
 Marikina River park -Barangka portion

Calumpang

Calumpang was named after a wild almond (Sterculia foetida). The largest among the barangays of Marikina during the colonial period, Calumpang was originally bordered on the northwest by the Marikina River and immediately opposite it are barangays Tañong and Jesus de la Peña. Floods and soil erosion would drastically alter its landscape, giving to shrinkage and expanding the two other barangays from silt buildup. Over time, part of the river dried up, giving way to what is known as Patay na Ilog, an area where Provident Village is now situated. To spare it from nature's threats, a dike was constructed in the early 1950s to secure the barangay. In the pre-war era, Calumpang's land extended as far west above the hills of Quezon City, which is a section of White Plains; on the north northwest, the Marikina River; on the east, Pasig; and as far north as the boundaries of barangays Jesus dela Peña, Tañong, and Barangka. With the creation of Quezon City in 1939, its jurisdiction was altered. Although it remained a part of Marikina, its boundary on the west sector was reduced. The area from the chapel of San Antonio de Padua to the residence of Tayug family were added to the city. It was only after the war, through the effort of Rep. Emilio dela Paz, Sr., that it regained a portion of the disputed area that extended up to Usiw Hills, near Quezon City, which is now part of Industrial Valley. Later, when Industrial Valley was created into an independent barangay, its area of influence was again reduced.

Point of Interests:
 Marikina River Park -Calumpang portion
 LRT-2 Santolan Station
 SM City Marikina
 San Antonio De Padua Parish Church
 Noah Gazebo
 Kalumpang Barangay Hall
 Calumpang Covered Court

Concepcion I (Uno)
Formerly known as the Bayan-Bayanan (little town), Barangay Concepcion, like the old Marikina area, was a rich agricultural area. Over time, though, new settlers found promise in its rich soil and migrants started to cultivate public lands, followed by the emergence of new communities. The barangay was officially named Concepcion after Mary the Immaculate Conception on June 16, 1956, with the enactment of Republic Act No. 1514. As an organized community, Marcelino de Guzman was installed as the first barangay leader in 1903 and held the post for five years.

Point of Interests:
 Immaculate Concepcion Parish
 Marikina High School
 Our Lady of Perpetual Succor College
 Bayan-bayanan Avenue (A national road named after the old barrio of Bayan-Bayanan, stretching along areas of Concepcion Uno and Marikina Heights)
 Naghihintay ng Bayani Pillars of Statue along Bayan-Bayanan Avenue (Concepcion and Marikina Heights)
 Barrio Bayan-Bayanan Old Parks (between boundary of Concepcion and Marikina Heights)
 Marikina Molecular Laboratory Building
 New Concepcion Market
 Con-Uno Barangay Hall
 St. Vincent Hospital

Concepcion II (Dos)
The barangay was created under Presidential Decree No. 1488, which was signed by President Ferdinand Marcos on June 11, 1978, stipulating the territorial boundaries in 1978. Officially, Concepcion Dos is bounded on the north by barangay Marikina Heights; on the west by Barangay Concepcion Uno and Barangay Sto. Niño; on the east by Antipolo City; and on the south by the municipality of Cainta. The first barangay election, held on July 4, 1978, elected lawyer Butch Crisol (1978–1980) as the first punong barangay.

Point of Interests:
 Lilac Street Food Hub
 Marikina Hotel and Convention Center
 Pamantasan ng Lungsod ng Marikina
 St. Paul Parish
 Rancho Estates
 Center for Innovation and Technology for Enterprises - DTI-NCRO
 Con-Dos Barangay Hall
 SSS Village
 Hacienda Heights

Fortune
A former sitio of Barangay Parang, Fortune was constituted as a separate entity on April 10, 2007, by virtue of Republic Act No. 9431. The new barangay, was named after a cigarette company located in the area, is the youngest among the 16 barangays of Marikina. Officially, the barangay is bounded on the north by the centerline of Fortune Avenue; on the east and north by the centerline of the Nangka River; on the southeast by the Marikina-Antipolo boundary until it intersects the centerline of Nangka River; on the southeast by the Marikina-Antipolo boundary until it intersects the centerline of Nangka River; on the west by the centerline of Park 8 Creek; on the west by the centerline of F. Balagtas Street; on the southwest by the centerline of Tanguile Street; and on the southwest between one depth along Monserrat Hill Street, La Milagrosa subdivision, until it intersects the Marikina-Antipolo boundary. The city mayor appointed the barangay's first set of officials after a plebiscite was held ratifying Fortune's creation. However, the administration of Empress 1 Subdivision and Foothill Area still belongs and governed by the barangay of Marikina Heights.

Point of Interests:
 Armscor
 Fortune Barangay Hall
 Fortune Tobacco Corporation (now known as PMFTC or Philip Morris Fortune Tobacco Corporation)
 Pugadlawin Civic Centre
 Marikina-San Mateo connecting bridges (Modesta and Monterrey Hills)
 Fortune Avenue (formerly an extension of C.M. Recto Street of Barangay Parang)
 Fortune Transportation Terminal

Industrial Valley Complex
Barangay Industrial Valley Complex was created under Batas Pambansa Bilang 203, approved by the unicameral legislature on March 25, 1982. The law is an offshoot of Pambansang Batas Bilang 1755. Under the law, the barangay was separated from Calumpang to form an independent barangay known as Barangay Industrial Valley. The new sub-territory would be legally be defined as follows: “Beginning from the intersection of Marikina Diversion Road and A. Bonifacio Avenue thence southward along the centerline of Marikina Diversion Road, until it intersects the centerline of Marikina River; thence southwest along the common boundary line of the municipality of Marikina and municipality of Pasig, province of Rizal, until it intersects the common boundary line of the municipality of Pasig and Quezon City; thence northward bounded by Quezon City until it intersects the point of beginning.” The first set of barangay officials was appointed by the President until their successors had been elected.

The Industrial Valley Complex includes the underground wastewater treatment facility, the Olandes Sewage Treatment Plant, which can process up to 10 million liters per day of domestic wastewater from 40,000 residents in the surrounding communities.

Point of Interests:
 Nativity of Our Lady Parish
 FVR Plaza
 Industrial Valley Complex Park
 Marikina River Park Extension
 Barangay IVC building

Jesus Dela Peña
The eldest Christian settlement in the city, the barangay was named after the first Augustinian parish of Jesus dela Peña (Jesus of the Rocks). It derived its identity after a Christ-like image was seen on the rock formations in the area. Aside from being host to Marikina's oldest church, the Jesus dela Pena Chapel which held its first mass in 1630, the place is also acknowledged as the traditional site of the first Holy Mass that was officiated in Marikina. In early colonial times, Jesus dela Peña was known as “Niyugan” (from niyog) because of the coconut plantations that dotted its agricultural landscape. With the arrival of the Jesuits, wheat from Mexico was introduced, earning another name for the place, the Tirriguhan, which is derivative of the Spanish “trigo” for wheat. Toward the latter part of colonial rule, influenced in part by the growing literacy among residents, alternative livelihoods, foremost of which was the shoe-making business, started to make a mark. The American Occupation greatly helped in developing the barangay. Health and educational infrastructure was introduced, while homespun industries became popular. In the years leading to the establishment of the Commonwealth, progress became more obvious. Marikina Bridge, a vital economic link to cities like Quezon and Manila, was formally opened in 1934. Under the Japanese rule, Jesus dela Peña, like many other areas in Marikina, was hit hard by atrocities. The Kempetai police, in particular, killed everyone who was suspected of spying for the Americans. The place was in ruins as a result of the indiscriminate bombings by the Allied Forces and invaders. Although devastated, Barangay Jesus dela Peña picked up the pieces and reassumed its role as the town's shoe capital. Today, it ranks as one of the city's most progressive business addresses.

Point of Interests:
 Jesus Dela Peña Chapel
 Marikina River Park
 Provident Villages
 Marikina River Park Animal Trail
 JDLP Barangay Hall
 Rizal Monument in front of L.V. Elementary School
 Roman Garden
 Marikina White Gazebo
 Marikina River Picnic Park

Malanday
Malanday was named after the shape of its territory, round and flat, just like that of a bilao (winnower). Malanday is bounded on the northeast by Barangay Concepcion, while to its southeast sector is Barangay Sto. Niño. On the southwest is Barangay Jesus dela Peña, and on the northwest is Quezon City. Mainly an agricultural area, Malanday was originally an uncultivated grassland that formed part of a rural community that would be known later for its rice field. To reach the place, pioneers had to transport and deliver commodities using the carabao-drawn , given its ease in negotiating mud tracks. For Malanday residents, 1937 holds a special significance – it was the year they were released from the bondage of paying land taxes to the Tuasons, owner of most of the lands in Marikina. As a result, petitions for transfer of land ownership were filed. In response, the government bought a big portion of a vast estate and distributed it to occupants, requiring only the beneficiaries to pay a nominal amount for every square meter of land owned over a period of one decade. This development would give rise to the founding of Barangay Malanday.

Point of Interests:
 Far Eastern University-Roosevelt
 Graceland Plaza
 Malanday Barangay Hall
 Lamuan
 Graceland Plaza
 Marikina River Park Extension -Malanday

Marikina Heights

During World War II, Barangay Marikina Heights was a vital military defense location. The Japanese built tunnels in the area to stage ambuscades, hide ammunition, store provisions, or seek shelter. The underground subway notably made it easy for the Japanese to reach their airfields known among residents as the Paliparan (airport). In post-war times, it was also the military training ground for Filipino soldiers who were deployed to the Korean War. The initial effort to create the area into a barangay was made on June 6, 1974, through the advice of the municipal council, by virtue of Resolution No. 76, which was later submitted to the provincial board of Rizal for action. In response, Provincial Resolution No. 75-746 was passed, recommending the creation of Marikina Heights to President Marcos. On April 2, 1978, Presidential Decree 1489 was issued, formally creating the new barangay. Marikina Heights is bounded by Fortune and Parang in the north, Cupang, Antipolo in the east, Concepcion Uno in the west and Concepcion Dos on the south.

Point of Interests:
 Ayala Malls Marikina Heights
 C & B Circle Mall
 Marikina Heights Foothill area (Located within Tanguile and Champaca Streets)
 Mari-Korea Monument
 Marikina Transport Terminal
 Marikina Hardin ng Bayan (Grotto Park)
 Marikina-Yeongdo Friendship Park (Evolution Park and Cow Statues)
 Marikina-Brampton Friendship Park (Gazebo Park)
 Liwasang Kalayaan
 Meralco Business Centre
 Naghihintay ng Bayani Pillars of Statue along Bayan-bayanan Avenue up to Liwasang Kalayaan (Includes Ka-Popoy Lagman statue in Meralco Centre and Torchman Statue in Marikina Heights Community Complex)
 Marikina Heights Community Complex (One Stop Shop Community Service Complex located at the heart of barangay which includes Barangay Hall, Barangay Health Center, SK Youth Office, Action Building, Marikina DSWD District 2 Office, Barangay Covered Court, Marikina Rehab Center etc.)
 Marist School
 St. Scholastica's Academy
 Terraces at Dao Architectural Building
 The Book Museum
 Molave wet and dry market
 Garcia General Hospital
 Gen. Ordoñez Street (formerly known as Molave Street, an elliptical road named after Gen. Marian Ordoñez of Barrio Bayan-Bayanan)

Nangka
Situated at the northernmost sector of Marikina along the concrete highway that leads to the towns of San Mateo and Montalban (Rizal), Barangay Nangka was the most rural among the city's barangays. It started as a small settlement built by two pioneering families and later evolved into a flourishing community largely due to a river, which is the barangay's namesake, that bilaterally cuts through Marikina and San Mateo, in Rizal Province. Named after the jackfruit, Barangay Nangka was created under RA 260, which was approved by Congress on June 21, 1959. It is situated on an elevated section of the southeastern part of Marikina and traverses the road that leads from the city to the towns of San Mateo and Montalban (now Rodiguez) in Rizal Province, where it shares common boundaries with Nangka River. It stretches up to sitio Balubad and the old railroad tracks known as Daang Bakal, and has an area of 181.68 hectares.

During colonial times, the area was home to rice fields and sugarcane plantations. Nangka was a thriving agricultural hub before it yielded to urban incursion; it was a primary source for root crops, vegetables, and rice. Conversion of farms into housing patches and the rise of commercial establishments eventually transformed the place into a population center and economic hub.

Point of Interests:
 Fairlane Market
 PMFTC Office
 Balubad Settlement
 Nangka Barangay Hall
 Marikina-San Mateo Connecting Bridge
 Nangka River

Parang
Before 1880, Parang, a sprawling estate of forest, farm, plains and low-lying regions, was part of Barrio Bayan-Bayanan. Initially, only 25 families, mostly orchard farmers, settled in the area. It was host to small sugar cane plantations and home to a forest area that was a good source of lumber, fruits, and wild life. When the railroad system reached its vicinity, specifically in the area between the sitio and its mother barangay, transport of farm products to Manila became easier. The legacy of this once-productive era can still be gleaned from the “Daang Bakal” tradition the place continues to remember. The arrival of the Americans at the turn of the 20th century would have a long-term impact on Parang (Tagalog for “thicket” or “bush”). Sugar cane plantation would give way to the cultivation of undergrowths, which in turn were developed as grazing farms for cattle, carabaos, and deer. This development, which made sprawling lands into grazing areas, would eventually give the place its name. Later, warehouses for stacking of fodders and serving as garage for tractors were built in the district. Coconuts, which were easy to cultivate and required lesser effort on the part of farmers, were introduced, slowly transforming the landscape of the place. Parang, given its dense forest, became a secure hangar for Japanese planes, and it was also made into a shelter for fleeing Imperial soldiers who were pursued by Allied Forces from Manila. But through it all, the barangay at once recovered from the travails of the conflict. Projects like houses started to make headway in the area and new shoe factories such as Eduardson Shoe Factory were opened.

Point of Interests:
 Converse Warehouse
 Delfi Marketing Inc. (Formerly known of Goya Food Corporation)
 Manila Boystown Complex
 Pamantasan ng Lungsod ng Marikina
 Parang Barangay Hall
 NGI Parang Market
 Barangay Parang Playground (also a location of tiangue or bazaar during holiday season)
 Pagoda Arch in front of Parang Elem. School
 Squibman Village
 Gen. B.G. Molina National Road (formerly known as Lapu-Lapu Street and named after General Benjamin G. Molina of Barrio Parang)

San Roque
Named after a saint, Barangay San Roque was a forestal region before the colonizers founded settlements here. Early migrants, encouraged by the opening of agricultural tracts following the arrival of missionaries, built communities, among them Daang Cainta. Two of the pioneering settlers in the area were the families of Don Isabelo Mendoza, a former gobernadorcillo, and Gervacio Carlos, later a stalwart in the shoe industry. Geographically, San Roque is bounded in the east by the Sierra Madre mountains; on the north, by Sta. Elena; to the south is Calumpang; and on the western sector, by the Marikina River. San Roque is known for its landmarks. The old residence of Apolonia Santos (Maestrang Oniang) was formerly a civil guard headquarters, cuartel, in the last decade of Spanish rule. During the American era, it housed the old Roosevelt High School. It used to be a church property but the Spaniards abandoned it just as the Revolution of 1896 started to gain momentum. Fray Rafael, the building administrator, sold the building to the government, which in turn was sold to Captain Itoy, Santos’ grandfather, before the Americans arrived.

Point of Interests:
 Angel Tuazon Avenue (Gil Fernando Avenue) Food Hub
 LRT-2 Marikina Station
 Marikina Footwear Center Building
 Marikina River Park -San Roque Portion
 San Miguel-Purefoods Corporation
 Shoe Museum
 Teatro Marikina
 Marikina Express
 OTTO Building
 Patio del Zapatero
 San Roque Cockpit Arena

Santa Elena

Sta. Elena got its name from a cross-shaped driftwood that was found floating in the river. The barangay traces it beginnings to 1687 when the Jesuits stationed at the Jesus de la Peña mission were looking for a new church site. The settlement was then a rural community of contented folk who survived from the fruits of their farms and depended on fish from the nearby Marikina River. Over time, the rural community flourished, becoming the poblacion of what now is Marikina. Although it had progressed very well, it also had its share of tragedies. In 1825 and 1880, strong tremors rocked the place. Another catastrophe occurred in 1887 when a fire burned down the flourishing neighborhood. A similar calamity took place in 1974 in which numerous laborers were lethally trapped inside the workplace. In World War II, like most of the barangays of the city, Sta. Elena also had its share of devastation from bombing runs.

Point of Interests:
 Kapitan Moy Building/Sentrong Pangkultura ng Marikina
 Marikina City Hall
 Marikina Freedom Park
 Marikina Polytechnic College
 Marikina Public Market
 Marikina River Park
 Marikina Sports Center
 Our Lady of Abandoned Parish
 TESDA Office
 Marikina City Public Library
 Women's Park
 Marikina Chinese Pagoda
 Marikina River Stage
 The Iconic Marikit Statue in Marikina River Park
 Holiday Tiangue at Marikina River Park
 Sta. Elena Chapel
 Kapitan Moy Monument & Community Park
 Shoe Avenue
 Busts of Marikina City Mayors in front of City Hall
 Marikina City Hall Fountain
 Marikina Sports Building
 Bulwagan ng Katarungan Bldg.

Santo Niño
Oral tradition traces the barangay's origin to 1667 when the Jesuits crossed Marikina River from Jesus dela Peña in search of a place where a new church could be built and a mission established. The missionaries found a rustic area known as Halang, so named after the orientation of the place, which is perpendicular to the rising sun. The place was later dedicated to the Holy Child or Sto. Niño, after whom it was named. In colonial times, Barangay Sto. Niño was bounded on the north by Malanday, on the east by Apongao, Cupang, and Mayamot, on the south by Sta. Elena, and the west by the Marikina River. Originally, the river had its bank along J.P. Rizal Street but geologic movement, flash floods, and siltation eventually led to the formation of a fertile area known as Tumana. In 1903, Sto. Niño hosted the first Aglipayan Chapel that was built in a location adjacent to Marikina Bridge. Unfortunately, the structure was destroyed in World War II. A new house of worship was later built in another location but a large fire gutted it in 1908.

Point of Interests:
 Amang Rodriguez Memorial Medical Center
 Blue Wave Mall
 Cityhood Park
 Marikina River Park
 Marikina Public Market
 Marikina Clock Tower Arch
 Shoe Avenue corner Sumulong Highway (the busiest intersection of Marikina City)
 Marikina Sports Center
 Marikina Valley Medical Center
 Marquinton Residences
 Sienna Tower Mall and Residences
 S&R Membership Shopping
 Tropicana Garden City Residences
 Sumulong Highway
 Paliparan
 Marikina River Park Tiangue
 Marikina Bridge
 Sto. Niño Baseball Field
 Marikina Bicycle and Skating Rink
 Marikina Chinese Temple
 City Engineering
 Marikina BIR Building
 Giant Floating Shoe

Tañong
Tañong traces its origin to March 1898 when pioneering families decided to formally establish a community. Like many rural communities in colonial Philippines, it had its formal beginnings during the period when missionary work was pervasive in areas with existing settlements and in places near river sources. During the Spanish rule, Tañong was populated by migrants from nearby Balara and Krus na Ligas (Gulod) areas. The area was not just a favorite hunting ground for individuals who were considered fugitives by the colonial regime; it was also an impoverished community that was subjected to many abuses of the civil guards. Life, however, was better under the American rule. New developments were introduced and living conditions improved. The eruption of war derailed all these inroads. But with Liberation, life in the barrio started to show promise with the influx of new arrivals, some of whom have permanently settled in an area aptly called, Halo-halo (hodgepodge).

Point of Interests:
 Loyola Memorial Park
 Provident Villages
 Tañong Barangay Hall
 A. Bonifacio Avenue
 Marikina River Park -Tañong portion

Tumana
A former sitio of Concepcion Uno, Barangay Tumana was created on April 10, 2007, under Republic Act No. 9432. It is the youngest among the sub-territories in the city. The place has been geologically shaped by soil buildup resulting from flooding, erosion, and landslide. Part of the barangay was a component of the riverbank but it has been converted into a fertile land. Over the centuries, the accretion has been cultivated as rice fields and fruit farms.and the owner of this land is Don Vicente Cruz

Point of Interests:
 Marikina River Mega Dike
 Tumana Bridge
 Loyala Grand Villas -Marikina Tumana Area
 Newly Built Tumana Barangay Hall
 Bagong Farmers Avenue (access to Quezon City)
 Bagong Farmers Talipapa

References

Marikina
Marikina
Marikina